Tel Maresha is the tell (archaeological mound) of the biblical Iron Age city of Maresha, and of the subsequent, post-586 BCE Idumean city known by its Hellenised name Marisa, Arabised as Marissa (ماريسا). It was first excavated in 1898-1900 by the British archaeologists Bliss and Macalister on behalf of the Palestine Exploration Fund and again after 1989 by Israeli archaeologist Amos Kloner on behalf of the Israel Antiquities Authority. Most of the artifacts of the British excavation are to be found today in the Istanbul Archaeology Museums.

This site is now protected as part of Beit Guvrin-Maresha National Park and its burial caves are recognized by UNESCO as a World Heritage Site.

Identification 

The location of Maresha in relation to Eleutheropolis (Beit Gubrin) has been noted by Eusebius in his Onomasticon, who wrote:
Maresa (Joshua 15:44). Tribe of Judah. It is now a deserted site about 2 milestones from Eleutheropolis.

C.R. Conder and H.H. Kitchener of the Palestine Exploration Fund surmised that Maresha should be identified with Khurbet Mar'ash, a ruin  mile south of Beit Jibrin, based on a phonetic similarity of their names. It was not until J. P. Peters and Hermann Thiersch explored the ruins of Khurbet Sandahannah (grid position 140111 PAL) in 1902 that they discovered a Greek funerary inscription in an adjacent burial cave (known as the Sidonian burial Cave) which explicitly identified the site as Maresha. Today, Khurbet Sandahannah is an archaeological tell comprising 24 dunams (5.9 acres), with its "lower city" incorporating into it an additional 400 dunams (98 acres).

History

Iron Age to Hellenistic period
Maresha was one of the cities of Judah during the time of the First Temple and is mentioned as part of the inheritance of the biblical tribe of Judah in the Book of Joshua.

Later, in the second Book of Chronicles, it is named as one of King Rehoboam's fifteen fortified cities. In 2 Chronicles it is the site of a battle against an invading Ethiopian army.

According to the Madaba Map, Maresha was the place "whence came Micah the Prophet". In the 6th century BCE, as result of Zedekiah's rebellion against the Babylonian kingdom and its king Nebuchadnezzar II, the latter occupied the Judean kingdom and sent many of its inhabitants into exile. This marked the end of Maresha as a Judahite city.

Following these events, Edomites who had lived east and south of the Dead Sea migrated to the area and Maresha emerged as a major Idumean city. Hence, from the Persian rule and throughout the Hellenistic kingdoms' rule in the region (6th – 1st century BCE), Maresha was part of the area known as Idumea, a Hellenised form of Edom. During the period of Persian rule, Phoenician colonies were encouraged to spread out along the coastal regions of Palestine and in the adjacent hill country of Judea, whence their early settlement in Maresha took its rise.

With the conquest of the region by Alexander the Great the city was settled by retired Greek soldiers as was then custom. Thus Maresha reached its zenith, developing as a Hellenistic city encompassing a multitude of Greek and oriental cultures including Sidonians and Nabataeans. With the advent of Hellenisation, the settlement pattern changed, as most everywhere in the region, and the city expanded far beyond the constraints of the fortified, raised tell or mound of Iron Age Maresha. Maresha became the center of an administrative district in the Ptolemaic empire, while from 200 BCE onward the center of a Seleucid administrative district.

Decline and fall

The city began its decline during the Maccabean Revolt against the Seleucid Empire (2nd century BCE) when the city was used as base to combat the rebels. The Book of Maccabees reports that Judas Maccabeus and his forces marched through Marisa in around 163/2 BCE when the city was burnt during Judas' conquest of the Idumaean region, from Hebron to Azotus (Ashdod).

Following the rebellion and its success, John Hyrcanus conquered the city in c. 112 BCE, forcibly converting its inhabitants to Judaism.

In 63 BCE, as part of the arrangements made by Pompey in the region, Maresha, along with all of Edom, was separated from the Jewish kingdom and returned to Idumea. In 47 BCE Julius Caesar then annexed the city to Judea.

Maresha was finally destroyed in 40 BCE by the Parthians as part of the power struggle between Antigonus of the Hasmoneans who had sought their aid and Herod, who was a son of the converted Antipater the Idumaean and was being supported by the Romans.

After Maresha: Beth Gabra/Eleutheropolis
After the demise of Maresha, the neighbouring Idumean/Jewish town of Beth Gabra or Beit Guvrin succeeded it as the main settlement in the area. Shaken by two successive and disastrous Jewish revolts against Roman rule in the 1st and 2nd centuries, the town recovered its importance only at the beginning of the 3rd century when it was re-established as a Roman city under the new name of Eleutheropolis. By the time of Eusebius of Caesarea (d. 340 CE), Maresha itself was already a deserted place: he mentions the city in his Onomasticon, saying that it was at a distance of "two milestones from Eleutheropolis".

Modern era
The Palestinian Arab village Bayt Jibrin, standing on the site of ancient Eleutheropolis, was depopulated during the 1948 Arab-Israeli war. In 1949 Kibbutz Beit Guvrin was established on part of Bayt Jibrin's lands. Most of the archaeologically important areas of ancient Maresha and Beit Guvrin/Eleutheropolis are now part of the Beit Guvrin-Maresha National Park.

Archaeology 

Archaeological excavations have been conducted at the site from 1972 to 2002 by Amos Kloner and from 2002 until 2014, by Bernie Alpert and Ian Stern, initially on behalf of the Archaeological Seminars Institute and the Israel Antiquities Authority (IAA), . From 2014 excavation and publication work continued on behalf of the Nelson Glueck School of Biblical Archaeology of Hebrew Union College-Jewish Institute of Religion. Less than 10 percent of the caves surrounding Tel Maresha have been excavated. Located some 400 meters above sea level, the bedrock is soft chalk, lending itself to the hewing of caves which were used as quarries, cisterns, tombs, animal mangers, olive presses and dovecots (columbaria). Many of the caves are linked by an underground maze of passageways.

During excavations at Tel Maresha, archaeologists uncovered a lead weight with a Greek inscription that read: "Year 170 (corresponding to 143/2 BCE), the agoranomos [= "market inspector"] being Antipater, son of Heliodorus, and Aristodamus, son of Ariston (?)." The calendar year is written according to the Seleucid era counting, during which same year Simon Thassi of the Hasmonean dynasty assumed power.

Among the major archaeological finds at this site is the Heliodorus Stele. This stele recounts events in Judaea prior to the Maccabean revolt and offers important historical evidence for  events that would precede events which modern day Jews commemorate during the holiday of Chanukah. 

Approximately 500 ostraca were found in Tell Maresha alone, 400 of which discovered since 2000. Included among these are both dated and undated dockets, tags with personal names and a number of letters of correspondence.

In 2022, a large number of knucklebones were found. Some were used to play games (for example Knucklebones) and others to contact the gods (Astragalomancy). Those that bear writing were in Greek.

Tel Maresha and national park 
Today Maresha is part of the Israeli national park of Beit Guvrin. Many of the ancient city's olive presses, columbaria and water cisterns can still be seen. Furthermore, the Archaeological Seminars Institute, under the license of the Israel Antiquities Authority, conducts excavations of Maresha's many quarried systems, and invites visitors to participate.

See also
Ancient synagogues in the Palestine region
Ancient synagogues in Israel
Archaeological Seminars Institute
Archaeology of Israel
Bayt Jibrin for most elaborate presentation (history, archaeology etc.)
Beit Guvrin-Maresha National Park
Eleutheropolis
Kibbutz Beit Guvrin
LMLK seal - seal impressions on jars from the time of King Hezekiah (ruled c. 715-686 BCE)
Tourism in Israel

Gallery

References

Bibliography 
 Kloner, Amos, Maresha Excavations Final Report I: Subterranean Complexes 21, 44, 70 (Jerusalem, Israel Antiquities Authority, 2003).
 Jacobson, D. M., The Hellenistic Paintings of Marisa (London, Palestine Exploration Fund, 2005).

 Stern, Ian, Excavations at Maresha Subterranean Complex 169. Final Report Seasons 2000-2016. (Annual of the Nelson Glueck School of Biblical Archaeology No. XI). Jerusalem, 2019.

External links

Bet Guvrin-Maresha National Park – official site
Pictures of Maresha

Ancient Israel and Judah
Archaeological sites in Israel
Edom
National parks of Israel
Former populated places in Southwest Asia
Protected areas of Southern District (Israel)
Canaanite cities
Disestablishments in the Hasmonean Kingdom